Cloud storage
Data management